The 1989 Boston Red Sox season was the 89th season in the franchise's Major League Baseball history. The Red Sox finished third in the American League East with a record of 83 wins and 79 losses, six games behind the Toronto Blue Jays.

Offseason
November 20, 1988: Dennis Lamp was signed as a free agent by the Red Sox.
December 8, 1988: Spike Owen was traded with Dan Gakeler to the Montreal Expos for John Dopson and Luis Rivera.
February 6, 1989: Danny Heep signed as a free agent with the Red Sox.

Regular season

Highlights
Wade Boggs had 205 hits and 107 walks, becoming the first player in MLB history to have at least 200 hits and 100 walks in four consecutive seasons. He also became the first player in the modern era (after 1900) to have at least 200 hits in seven consecutive seasons.

Season standings

Record vs. opponents

Notable transactions
August 5, 1989: Ed Romero was released by the Red Sox.
August 7, 1989: Greg A. Harris was selected off waivers by the Red Sox from the Philadelphia Phillies.

Opening Day lineup

Source:

The Red Sox lost their Opening Day game, 5–4 in 11 innings, to the Baltimore Orioles at Memorial Stadium in Baltimore. The ceremonial first pitch was thrown by President George H. W. Bush.

Alumni game
The team held an old-timers game on May 6, before a scheduled home game against the Texas Rangers. Festivities included an appearance by Carl Yastrzemski, shortly after his election to the Hall of Fame. Red Sox alumni lost to a team of former MLB players from other clubs, by a 9–0 score in three innings of play.

Roster

Statistical leaders 

Source:

Batting 

Source:

Pitching 

Source:

Awards and honors
Awards
 Wade Boggs, Silver Slugger Award (3B)
 Nick Esasky, AL Player of the Month (August)

Accomplishments
 Wade Boggs, American League Leader, Runs (113)
 Wade Boggs, American League Leader, Doubles (51)

All-Star Game
 Wade Boggs, third base, starter
 Mike Greenwell, outfield, reserve

Farm system

The Gulf Coast League Red Sox replaced the Arizona League Red Sox/Mariners (a cooperative team) as the domestic Rookie League affiliate.

The Red Sox shared a DSL team with the Baltimore Orioles and Milwaukee Brewers.

Source:

References

External links
1989 Boston Red Sox team page at Baseball Reference
1989 Boston Red Sox season at baseball-almanac.com

Boston Red Sox seasons
Boston Red Sox
Boston Red Sox
Red Sox